East Oakland Township is one of twelve townships in Coles County, Illinois, USA.  As of the 2010 census, its population was 1,388 and it contained 663 housing units. The township changed its name from Oakland Township on May 7, 1860.

Geography

Cities, towns, villages
Oakland

Extinct towns
Kings
Pinhook

Cemeteries
The township contains six cemeteries: Bell, Berry, Fairview, Oak Grove, Rosedale and Shields.

Major highways
  Illinois Route 133

Demographics

School districts
 Kansas Community Unit School District 3
 Oakland Community Unit School District 5

Political districts
 Illinois' 15th congressional district
 State House District 110
 State Senate District 55

References
 
 United States Census Bureau 2007 TIGER/Line Shapefiles
 United States National Atlas

External links
 City-Data.com
 Illinois State Archives

Adjacent townships 

Townships in Coles County, Illinois
Townships in Illinois